Admiral Sir Hugh Francis Paget Sinclair,  (18 August 1873 – 4 November 1939), known as Quex Sinclair, was a British intelligence officer. He was Director of British Naval Intelligence  between 1919 and 1921, and he subsequently helped to set up the Secret Intelligence Service (SIS, commonly MI6) and GCHQ.

Career
Sinclair was educated at Stubbington House School and joined the Royal Navy as a cadet aged 13 on 15 July 1886. He was promoted to  lieutenant on 31 December 1894.

He entered the Naval Intelligence Division at the beginning of the First World War. He became Director of Naval Intelligence in February 1919 and Chief of the Submarine Service in 1921. He became the second director of SIS in 1923. He was promoted vice-admiral on 3 March 1926 and full admiral on 15 May 1930. Sinclair also founded GC&CS, later to be known as GCHQ in 1919.

Beginning in 1919 he attempted to absorb the counterintelligence service MI5 into the SIS to strengthen Britain's efforts against Bolshevism, an idea that was finally rejected in 1925. The SIS remained small and underfunded during the interwar years. By 1936, Sinclair realised that the Gestapo had penetrated several SIS stations and Claude Dansey, who had been removed from his station in Rome, set up Z Organization, intended to work independently of the compromised SIS.

In 1938, with a second war looming, Sinclair set up Section D, dedicated to sabotage. In spring 1938, using £6,000 of his own money, he bought Bletchley Park to be a wartime intelligence station.

Sinclair was asked in December 1938 to prepare a dossier on Adolf Hitler, for the attention of Lord Halifax, the Foreign Secretary, and Neville Chamberlain, the Prime Minister. In the dossier, which was received poorly by Sir George Mounsey, the Foreign Office assistant undersecretary, who believed that it did not gel with Britain's policy of appeasement, Sinclair described Hitler as possessing the characteristics of "fanaticism, mysticism, ruthlessness, cunning, vanity, moods of exaltation and depression, fits of bitter and self-righteous resentment; and what can only be termed a streak of madness; but with it all there is a great tenacity of purpose, which has often been combined with extraordinary clarity of vision".

Sinclair became seriously ill with cancer, causing Alexander Cadogan to note on 19 October 1939, that he was "going downhill". On 29 October, Sinclair underwent an operation for his cancer and died on 4 November 1939, aged 66, five days before the Venlo incident.

Family
Hugh was the son of Admiral Frederick Beauchamp Paget Seymour, 1st Baron Alcester and Agnes Sinclair.  In his will, Frederick Seymour, left the balance of his estate to Agnes Sinclair for her lifetime.  On her death, two fifths were left to Frederick Charles Horace Sinclair and one fifth each to Hugh Francis Paget Sinclair, Claude Hamilton Sinclair and Evelyn Beauchamp Sinclair.

Hugh married, in 1907, Gertrude Attenborough and had two sons.  They were divorced in 1920.

Awards and decorations
 1911 King George V Coronation Medal
 1916 Companion of the Order of the Bath
 1918 3rd Class, Order of the Rising Sun 
 1918 Officer, the Legion of Honour 
 1935 Knight Commander, the Order of the Bath
 1937 King George VI Coronation Medal

References

|-

|-

1873 births
1939 deaths
Knights Commander of the Order of the Bath
World War I spies for the United Kingdom
Interwar-period spies
Royal Navy admirals
Bletchley Park people
Military personnel from Southampton
Chiefs of the Secret Intelligence Service
Directors of Naval Intelligence
People educated at Stubbington House School